Pholhas (sheets) is a Brazilian rock band, from São Paulo that was quite successful with songs like My Mistake and She Made Me Cry and others.

History

The band was created in 1969 with the following formation: Helio Santisteban (keyboard), Paulo Fernandes (drums), Oswaldo Malagutti (bass) and Wagner "Bitão" Benatti (guitar), with the four taking turns on vocals. They started doing covers for bands from the United States and England and started composing in English.

His first LP, "Dead Faces", released in 1973 by RCA, contained only songs in English. A simple compact extracted from this album, with the song "My Mistake" (only apparently simplistic: it tells the story of a passionate murder, but resuming the primitive blues tradition of using everyday tragedies to reflect on the meaning of life); compact that reached the top of the charts, selling 400,000 copies in just three months. Then, other songs were released in compacts, such as "She Made Me Cry", "I Never Did Before" and "Forever", all reaching sales exceeding 300 thousand copies. In 1975, the debut album was released on the Hispanic market under the title "Hojas", giving the group another Gold Record.

In 1977 the group changed its orientation, releasing the LP "O Som das Discotheques", with covers of the main hits of the genre, and reaching 150 thousand copies sold.

Shortly thereafter, Hélio Santisteban decided to pursue a solo career and Marinho Testoni, ex-Casa das Máquinas, took his place. This led to another change in the group, which released a progressive rock album, and for the first time with lyrics in Portuguese. The album sold much less than the previous ones, but it became cult for a segment of public.

In 1978 it was Oswaldo Malagutti who left the band, being replaced by bassist João Alberto, also ex-"Casa das Máquinas". Malagutti created with Santisteban the MOSH Studio (acronym of their names) and even today works with production and mastering of musical CDs and DVDs.

In 1980 Hélio Santisteban returned to the group, which resumed the tradition of singing and composing in English, then releasing the LP "Memories". A few months later, with Marinho's departure, Pholhas reached the following formation: Bitão (guitar), Paulo Fernandes (drums), Hélio Santisteban (keyboards) and João Alberto (bass).

At the end of 2007 Hélio Santisteban leaves the band definitively, from then on, Bitão, Paulinho and João Alberto decide not to have a fixed keyboardist anymore, but a keyboardist specially invited for each performance. This formula worked so well that it became an attraction more of the shows.

Still on the road after 42 years, the band PHOLHAS continues to present shows all over Brazil and abroad, with recreations of hits from English and American rock, especially from Bee Gees, Creedence Clearwater Revival, Elvis Presley, Rolling Stones and Beatles.

On August 26, 2018, its keyboardist and vocalist Helio Santisteban dies at 69 years of age.

Discography

Albums

1973 - Dead Faces
1974 - Forever
1975 - Hojas
1975 -Pholhas
1977 - Pholhas
1978 - O Som das Discotheques
1980 - Memories
1982 - Pholhas
1985 - Wings
1988 - Corte sem Lei (in Portuguese)
2003 - 70's Greatest Hits
2015 - Pholhas – 45 Anos
 2017 - Black & White

Singles and EPs

 1972-  My Mistake
 1973 - My Mistake/Pope
 1973 - She Made Me Cry/In My Way
 1973 - She Made Me Cry
 1974 - Pholhas
 1974 - Forever/Special Girl
 1975 - My Mistake/She Made Me Cry
 1975 - Special Girl
 1975 - Ya Me Voy De Aqui = Good-Bye
 1976 - Get Back/My Sorrow 
 1976 - Pholhas
 1977 - I Still Remember
 1978 - Embalos De Sábado À Noite
 1979 - I Love You/I Remember
 1980 - Let Us Try/ Your Rainbow
 1980 - I Love You

Compilations

1977 - Disco de Ouro
1981 - Disco de Ouro, Vol. 2
1987 - The Night Before
1996 - Pholhas, 25 Anos
1997 - Pholhas Forever, 26 Anos
2001 - Pholhas
2005 - Maxximum
2006 - 20 Super Sucessos
2009 - Sempre
 Unknown - La Audicao Volumen 8

References

External links
Official Page
Pholhas on Discogs
Estúdio Mosh Official Site
Facebook Page

Musical groups from São Paulo (state)
Brazilian progressive rock groups
Musical groups established in 1969
Disco groups
English-language musical groups from Brazil